Marble Mountain may refer to:

Mountains
 Marble Mountain (Alaska) in Glacier Bay National Park, USA
 Marble Mountain (Colorado) in Colorado, USA
 Marble Mountain (Newfoundland) in Newfoundland, Canada
 Marble Mountain (New Jersey) in New Jersey, USA
 Marble Mountains (Siskiyou County) in California, USA
 Marble Mountains (San Bernardino County) in California, USA
 Marble Mountains (Vietnam), Vietnam

Communities
 Marble Mountain, Nova Scotia, Canada
 Marble Mountain, California, United States

Other uses
 Marble Mountain Ski Resort
 Marble Mountain Wilderness
 Marble Mountain-Trout Creek Hill
 Marble Mountain Air Facility, abandoned helicopter facility used during the Vietnam War